The taxonomy of the vertebrates presented by John Zachary Young in The Life of Vertebrates (1962) is a system of classification with emphasis on this group of animals.

Phylum Chordata

Phylum Chordata [p. 24]
Subphylum 1. Hemichordata (e.g., Balanoglossus, Cephalodiscus, Rhabdopleura)
Subphylum 2. Cephalochordata (= Acrania) (e.g., Branchiostoma)
Subphylum 3. Tunicata (e.g., Ciona)
Subphylum 4. Vertebrata (= Craniata) 
Superclass 1. Agnatha
Class 1. Cyclostomata
Class 2. †Cephalaspidomorphi (e.g., †Cephalaspis)
Class 3. †Pteraspidomorphi (e.g., †Pteraspis)
Class 4. †Anaspida (e.g., †Birkenia, †Jamoytius)
Superclass 2. Gnathostomata 
Class 1. †Placodermi (e.g., †Acanthodes)
Class 2. Elasmobranchii
Class 3. Actinopterygii 
Class 4. Crossopterygii 
Class 5. Amphibia 
Class 6. Reptilia 	
Class 7. Aves 
Class 8. Mammalia

Subphylum Vertebrata (= Craniata)

Superclass Agnatha

Subphylum Vertebrata (= Craniata)
Superclass 1. Agnatha [p. 81]
Class 1. Cyclostomata 
Order 1. Petromyzontia (e.g., Petromyzon, Lampetra, Entosphenus, Geotria, Mordacia)
Order 2. Myxinoidea (e.g., Myxine, Bdellostoma)
Class 2. †Osteostraci (e.g., †Cephalaspis, †Tremataspis)
Class 3. †Anaspida (e.g., †Birkenia, †Jamoytius)
Class 4. †Heterostraci (e.g., †Astraspis, †Pteraspis, †Drepanaspis)
Class 5. †Coelolepida (e.g., †Thelodus, †Lanarkia)

Superclass Gnathostomata

Class Elasmobranchii

Superclass 2. Gnathostomata 
Class Elasmobranchii (= Chondrichthyes) [p. 175]
Subclass 1. Selachii 
Order 1. †Cladoselachii (e.g., †Cladoselache, †Goodrichia)
Order 2. †Pleuracanthodii (e.g., †Pleuracanthus) 
Order 3. Protoselachii (e.g., †Hybodiis, Heterodontus)
Order 4. Euselachii
Suborder 1. Pleurotremata
Division 1. Notidanoidea (e.g., Hexanchus, Chlamydoselache)
Division 2. Galeoidea (e.g., Scyliorhinus, Mustelus, Cetorhinus, Carcharodon)
Division 3. Squaloidea (e.g., Squalus, Squatina, Pristiophorus, Alopias)
Suborder 2. Hypotremata (e.g., Raja, Rhinobatis, Pristis, Torpedo, Trygon)
Subclass 2. Bradyodonti 
Order 1. †Eubradyodonti (e.g., †Helodus)
Order 2. Holocephali (e.g., Chimaera)

Class Actinopterygii

Class Actinopterygii [p. 228]
Superorder 1. Chondrostei 
Order 1. Palaeoniscoidei (e.g., †Cheirolepis, †Palaeoniscus, †Amphicentrum, †Platysomus, †Dorypterus, †Cleithrolepis, †Tarrasius, Polypterus [bichir])
Order 2. Acipenseroidei (e.g., †Chondrosteus, Acipenser [sturgeon], Polyodon [paddle-fish])
Order 3. Subholostei (e.g., †Ptycholepis)
Superorder 2. Holostei (e.g., †Acentrophorus, †Lepidotes, †Dapedius, †Microdon, Amia [bowfin], Lepisosteus [gar-pike])  
Superorder 3. Teleostei
Order 1. Isospondyli (e.g., †Leptolepis, †Portheus, Clupea [herring], Salmo [trout])
Order 2. Ostariophysi (e.g., Cyprinus [carp], Tinea [tench], Silurus [catfish])
Order 3. Apodes (e.g., Anguilla [eel], Conger [conger eel]) 
Order 4. Mesichthyes (e.g., Esox [pike], Belone, Exocoetus [flying fish], Gasterosteus [stickle-back], Syngnathus [pipe-fish], Hippocampus [seahorse])
Order 5. Acanthopterygii (e.g., †Hoplopteryx, Zens [John Dory], Perca [perch], Labrus [wrasse], Uranoscopus [star gazer], Blennius [blenny], Gadus [whiting], Pleuronectes [plaice], Solea [sole], Lophius [angler-fish])

Class Crossopterygii

Class Crossopterygii [p. 268]
Order 1. Rhipidistia
Suborder 1. †Osteolepidoti (e.g., †Osteolepis, †Sauripterus, †Diplopterax, †Eusthenopteron)
Suborder 2. Coelacanthini (= Actinistia) (e.g., †Coelacanthus, †Undina, Latimeria)
Order 2. Dipnoi (e.g., †Dipterus, †Ceratodus, Neoceratodus, Protopterus, Lepidosiren)

Class Amphibia

Class Amphibia [p. 296]
 Subclass 1. †Stegocephalia
Order 1. †Labyrinthodontia
Suborder 1. †Ichthyostegalia (e.g., †Ichthyostega, †Elpistostege) 
Suborder 2. †Embolomeri (e.g., †Eogyrinus, †Loxomma)
Suborder 3. †Rhachitomi (e.g., †Eryops, †Cacops)
Suborder 4. †Stereospondyli (e.g., †Capitosaurus, †Buettneria)
Order 2. †Phyllospondyli (e.g., †Branchiosaurus)
Order 3. †Lepospondyli (e.g., †Dolichosoma, †Diplocaulus, †Microbrachis)
Order 4. †Adelospondyli (e.g., †Lysorophus)
 Subclass 2. Urodela (= Caudata) (e.g., Molge, Salamandra, Ambystoma, Necturus) 
 Subclass 3. Anura (= Salientia) (e.g., †Miobatrachus, †Protobatrachiis, Rana, Bufo, Hyla, Pipa) 
 Subclass 4. Apoda (= Gymnophiona = Caecilia) (e.g., Ichthyophis, Typhlonectes)

Class Reptilia 

Class Reptilia [p. 369]
Subclass 1. Anapsida 
Order 1. †Cotylosauria (e.g., †Seymouria, †Captorhinus, †Diadectes)
Order 2. Chelonia (e.g., †Eunotosaurus, †Triassochelys, Chelys, Emys, Chelone, Testudo) 
Subclass 2. †Synaptosauria 
Order 1. †Protorosauria (e.g., †Araeoscelis, †Tanystropheus)
Order 2. †Sauropterygia (e.g., †Lariosaurus, †Pliosaurus, †Plesiosaurus, †Placodus)
Subclass 3. †Ichthyopterygia 
Order 1. †Ichthyosauria (e.g., †Mixosaurus, †Ichthyosaurus)
Subclass 4. Lepidosauria 
Order 1. †Eosuchia (e.g., †Youngina, †Prolacerta) 
Order 2. Rhynchocephalia (e.g., †Homoesaurus, †Rhynchosaurus, Sphenodon [= Hatteria])
Order 3. Squamata
Suborder 1. Lacertilia (= Sauria)
Infraorder 1. Gekkota (e.g., Gecko) 
Infraorder 2. Iguania (e.g., Iguana, Anolis, Phrynosoma, Draco, Lyriocephalus, Agama, Chamaeleo)
Infraorder 3. Scincomorpha (e.g., Lacerta, Scincus, Amphisbaena)
Infraorder 4. Anguimorpha (e.g., †Dolichosaurus, †Aigialosaurus, †Tylosaurus, Varanus, Lanthanotus, Anguis)
Suborder 2. Ophidia (= Serpentes) (e.g., †Palaeophis, Python, Natrix, Naja, Vipera)
Subclass 5. Archosauria 
Order 1. †Pseudosuchia (= †Thecodontia) (e.g., †Euparkeria, †Saltoposuchus)
Order 2. †Phytosauria (e.g., †Phytosaurus, †Mystriosuchus)
Order 3. Crocodilia (e.g., †Protosuchus, Crocodilus, Alligator, Caiman, Gavialis)
Order 4. †Saurischia
Suborder 1. †Theropoda (e.g., †Compsognathus, †Ornitholestes, †Allosaurus, †Tyrannosaurus, †Struthiomimus)
Suborder 2. †Sauropoda (e.g., †Apatosaurus [= †Brontosaurus], †Diplodocus, †Yaleosaurus, †Plateosaurus, Brachiosaurus)
Order 5. †Ornithischia
Suborder 1. †Ornithopoda (e.g., †Camptosaurus, †Iguanodon, †Hadrosaurus)
Suborder 2. †Stegosauria (e.g., †Stegosaurus) 
Suborder 3. †Ankylosauria (e.g., †Ankylosaurus, †Nodosaurus)
Suborder 4. †Ceratopsia (e.g., †Triceratops) 
Order 6. †Pterosauria (e.g., †Rhamphorhynchus, †Pteranodon)
Subclass 6. †Synapsida [pp. 370, 533]
Order 1. †Pelycosauria (= †Theromorpha) (e.g., †Varanosaurus, †Edaphosaurus, †Dimetrodon)
Order 2. †Therapsida
Suborder 1. †Dicynodontia (e.g., †Galepus, †Moschops, †Dicynodon, †Kannemeyeria)
Suborder 2. †Theriodontia (e.g., †Cynognathus, †Scymnognathus, †Bauria, †Dromatherium, †Tritylodon, †Oligokyphus)
Order 3. †Mesosauria (= †Proganosauria) (e.g., †Mesosaurus)

Class Aves

Class Aves [p. 509]
Subclass 1. †Archaeornithes (e.g., †Archaeopteryx)
Subclass 2. Neornithes 
Superorder 1. †Odontognathae (e.g., †Hesperornis, †Ichthyornis)
Superorder 2. Palaeognathae [ratites] (e.g., Struthio, Rhea, Dromiceius, Casuarius, †Dinornis, †Aepyornis, Apteryx, Tinamus)
Superorder 3. Impennae [penguins] (e.g., Spheniscus, Aptenodytes) 
Superorder 4. Neognathae
Order 1. Gaviiformes [loons] (e.g., Gavia [loon]) 
Order 2. Colymbiformes [grebes] (e.g., Colymbus [= Podiceps] [grebe])
Order 3. Procellariiformes [petrels] (e.g., Fulmarus [petrel], Puffinus [shearwater], Diomedea [albatross]) 
Order 4. Pelecaniformes (e.g., Phalacrocorax [cormorant], Pelecanus [pelican], Sida [gannet])
Order 5. Ciconiiformes (e.g., Ciconia [stork], Ardea [heron], Phoenicopterus [flamingo]) 
Order 6. Anseriformes [ducks] (e.g., Anas [duck], Cygnus [swan])
Order 7. Falconiformes [hawks] (e.g., Falco [kestrel], Aquila [eagle], Buteo [buzzard], Neophron [vulture], Milvus [kite])
Order 8. Galliformes [game birds] (e.g., Gallus [fowl], Phasianus [pheasant], Perdix [partridge], Lagopus [grouse], Meleagris [turkey], Numida [guinea fowl], Pavo [peacock], Opisthocomus [hoatzin])
Order 9. Gruiformes [rails] (e.g., Fulica [coot], Gallinula [moorhen], Crex [corn-crake], Grus [crane], †Phororhacos, †Diatryma) 
Order 10. Charadriiformes [waders and gulls] (e.g., Numenius [curlew], Capella [snipe], Calidris [sandpiper], Vanellus [lapwing], Scolopax [woodcock], Larus [gull], Uria [guillemot], Plautus [little auk])
Order 11. Columbiformes [pigeons] (e.g., Columba [pigeon], †Raphus [dodo])
Order 12. Cuculiformes [cuckoos] (e.g., Cuculus [cuckoo]) 
Order 13. Psittaciformes [parrots]
Order 14. Strigiformes [owls] (e.g., Athene [little owl], Tyto [farm owl], Strix [tawny owl])
Order 15. Caprimulgiformes [nightjars] (e.g., Caprimulgus [nightjar])
Order 16. Micropodiformes (e.g., Apus [swift], Trochilus [humming-bird]) 
Order 17. Coraciiformes (e.g., Merops [bee-eater], Alcedo [kingfisher]) 
Order 18. Piciformes [woodpeckers] (e.g., Picus [woodpecker]) 
Order 19. Passeriformes [perching birds] (e.g., Corvus [rook], Sturnus [starling], Fringilla [finch], Passer [house-sparrow], Alauda [lark], Anthus [pipit], Motacilla [wagtail], Certhia [tree-creeper], Parus [tit], Lanius [shrike], Sylvia [warbler], Turdus [thrush], Erithacus [British robin], Luscinia [nightingale], Prunella [hedge-sparrow], Troglodytes [wren], Hirundo [swallow])

Class Mammalia

Class Mammalia [p. 533]
Subclass 1. Eotheria 
Order †Docodonta (e.g., †Morganucodon, †Docodon)
Order incertae sedis †Diarthrognathus
Subclass 2. Prototheria 
Order Monotremata (e.g., Tachyglossus [= Echidna] [spiny anteater], Zaglossus [= Proechidna], Ornithorhynchus [platypus])
 Subclass 3. †Allotheria 
 Order †Multituberculata (e.g., †Plagiaulax,  †Ptilodus) 
Subclass 4. Theria 
 Infraclass 1. †Pantotheria 
Order 1. †Eupantotheria (e.g., †Amphitherium)
 Order 2. †Symmetrodonta (e.g., †Spalacotherium)
Infraclass 2. Metatheria 
Order Marsupialia 
Infraclass 3. Eutheria (= Placentalia) 
Order incertae sedis †Triconodonta (e.g., †Amphilestes, †Triconodon)

Infraclass Metatheria

Infraclass 2. Metatheria [p. 563]
Order Marsupialia 
Superfamily 1. Didelphoidea (e.g., †Eodelphis, Didelphis [opossum], Chironectes [water opossum])
Superfamily 2. †Borhyaenoidea (e.g., †Thylacosmilus, †Borhyaena)
Superfamily 3. Dasyuroidea (e.g., Dasyurus [native cat], Sarcophilus [Tasmanian devil], Thylacinus [Tasmanian wolf], Myrmecobius [banded ant-eater], Notoryctes [marsupial mole], Sminthopsis [pouched mouse])
Superfamily 4. Perameloidea (e.g., Perameles [bandicoot])
Superfamily 5. Caenolestoidea (e.g., †Palaeothentes [= †Epanorthus], Caenolestes [opossum-rat])
Superfamily 6. Phalangeroidea (e.g., Trichosurus [Australian opossum], Petaurus [flying opossum], Phascolarctos [koala bear], Vombatus [wombat], Macropus [kangaroo], Bettongia [rat kangaroo], †Diprotodon, †Thylacoleo)

Infraclass Eutheria

Infraclass 3. Eutheria [p. 577]
Cohort 1. Unguiculata 
Order 1. Insectivora [p. 581]
Order 2. Chiroptera [p. 585]
Order 3. Dermoptera 
Order 4. †Taeniodonta 
Order 5. †Tillodontia 
Order 6. Edentata [p. 592]
Order 7. Pholidota 
Order 8. Primates [p. 602]
Cohort 2. Glires [p. 653]
Order 1. Rodentia 
Order 2. Lagomorpha
Cohort 3. Mutica [p. 666]
Order Cetacea 
Cohort 4. Ferungulata 
Superorder 1. Ferae [p. 679]
Order Carnivora 
Superorder 2. Protungulata [p. 699]
Order 1. †Condylarthra 
Order 2. †Notoungulata 
Order 3. †Litopterna 
Order 4. †Astrapotheria 
Order 5. Tubulidentata 
Superorder 3. Paenungulata [p. 706]
Order 1. Hyracoidea 
Order 2. Proboscidea 
Order 3. †Pantodonta 
Order 4. †Dinocerata
Order 5. †Pyrotheria
Order 6. †Embrithopoda
Order 7. Sirenia 
Superorder 4. Mesaxonia [p. 723]
Order Perissodactyla 
Superorder 5. Paraxonia [p. 745]
Order Artiodactyla

Order Primates

Order 8. Primates [p. 602]
Suborder 1. Prosimii
Infraorder 1. Lemuriformes 
Family 1. †Plesiadapidae (e.g., †Plesiadapis)
Family 2. †Adapidae (e.g., †Notharctus, †Adapis) 
Family 3. Lemuridae (e.g., †Megaladapis, Lemur [common lemur])
Family 4. Indridae (e.g., Indri [indris])
Family 5. Daubentoniidae (e.g., Daubentonia [= Cheiromys] [aye-aye])
Infraorder 2. Lorisiformes
Family. Lorisidae (e.g., Loris [slender loris], Galago [bush baby], Perodicticus [potto])
Infraorder 3. Tarsiiformes
Family 1. †Anaptomorphidae (e.g., †Necrolemur, †Pseudoloris)
Family 2. Tarsiidae (e.g., Tarsius [tarsier]) 
Suborder 2. Anthropoidea 
Superfamily 1. Ceboidea [New World monkeys]
Family 1. Callithricidae (e.g., Callithrix [= Hapale] [marmoset])
Family 2. Cebidae (e.g., †Homunculus, Cebus [capuchin], Ateles [spider monkey], Alouatta [howler monkey]) 
Superfamily 2. Cercopithecoidea
Family 1. †Parapithecidae (e.g., †Parapithecus)
Family 2. Cercopithecidae [Old World monkeys] (e.g., †Mesopithecus, Macaca [rhesus monkey, macaque], Papio [baboon], Mandrillus [mandrill], Cercopithecus [guenon], Presbytis [langur], Colobus, [guereza])
Superfamily 3. Hominoidea 
Family 1. Pongidae apes (e.g., †Propliopithecus, †Pliopithecus, †Dryopithecus, †Oreopithecus †Australopithecus, †Proconsul, Hylobates gibbon, Pongo orangutan, Pan chimpanzee, Gorilla gorilla)
Family 2. Hominidae human (e.g., †Pithecanthropus [= †Sinanthropus] [Java and Pekin man], Homo [human (“all living races”)])

References

Systems of animal taxonomy